Susan Mary Provan  is an Australian performing arts producer, who has been director of the Melbourne International Comedy Festival since 1994.

Provan studied a Bachelor of Arts at the University of Melbourne. She was the manager of the Last Laugh Theatre, a restaurant and comedy venue in Melbourne, before joining Circus Oz as general manager in 1985. In 1993, she became an associate producer at the State Theatre Company of South Australia, before taking up the directorship of the Melbourne International Comedy Festival in 1994.

Provan was added to the Victorian Honour Roll of Women in 2017, and in the 2018 Queen's Birthday Honours was made an Officer of the Order of Australia for distinguished service to arts administration through festival leadership and governance, to the tourism sector in Victoria, and to the promotion of Australian comedy.

References

External links

Year of birth missing (living people)
Living people
Australian theatre managers and producers
University of Melbourne alumni
Officers of the Order of Australia